AtlasJet (ex-Rusair) was an airline with its headquarters in Moscow, Russia. It provided charter services and business flights, aviation management and project support. It also offered international medevac services.

History 
The airline was established on 30 November 1994 and started operations in 1994. It was formerly known as CGI Aero. It was 100% owned by Clintondale Aviation. By 2010, it was sold to a new owner. Following the fatal accident in 2011, its AOC license was revoked.
In 28 October 2011, the airline re-opened after changing its name to "AtlasJet".

Fleet 
As of June 2015, the AtlasJet fleet includes the following aircraft:

 2 Sukhoi Superjet 100

Accidents and incidents
On 20 June 2011, a RusAir Tupolev Tu-134A-3K, Flight 243, operating for RusLine, with 43 passengers and nine crew crash landed, broke up, and caught fire on a highway short of the runway at Petrozavodsk Airport while en route from Moscow to Petrozavodsk, killing 47 people and leaving five survivors.

References

External links 

 
 RusAir 
 Clintondale Aviation
 RusAir aircraft

Defunct airlines of Russia
Airlines established in 1994
Airlines disestablished in 2011
Companies based in Moscow
Defunct charter airlines
Russian companies established in 1994
2011 disestablishments in Russia